Yve is a masculine or French feminine given name of Germanic origin, which is related to Yvonne and Yves, and may be used as a shortened form of Yvain or Yvette. It is also an uncommon surname. Yve may refer to:

Yve-Alain Bois (born 1952), French art historian
Yve Buckland (born 1956), British public servant
Yve Laris Cohen (born 1985), American artist
Yve Fehring (born 1973), German TV presenter

See also
Eve (name)
Evi (disambiguation)
Evie (disambiguation)
Ive (given name)
Ivey (disambiguation)
Ivy (disambiguation)
Yves (given name)
Yvette
Yvonne

References

Given names derived from plants or flowers